Windy City is the fourth solo studio album by bluegrass-country artist Alison Krauss. Released on February 17, 2017, the album is Krauss' first solo release since Forget About It in 1999, and includes ten covers of classic songs that she selected with producer Buddy Cannon.

The deluxe edition adds four live versions of tracks. The Target Exclusive version adds two more tracks to the deluxe edition. The Cracker Barrel Exclusive version adds one more track to the regular edition. The Barnes & Noble Exclusive vinyl LP version has an alternate cover image.

Critical reception

Windy City received generally positive reviews from music critics. At Metacritic, which assigns a normalized rating out of 100 to reviews from mainstream critics, the album has an average score of 69 based on 10 reviews, indicating "generally favorable reviews."

Mark Deming of AllMusic rated the album four out of five stars and calls it "a richly satisfying experience." Writing for Entertainment Weekly, Madison Vain rated the album an A- and states Windy City "enforces Krauss' legacy as one of American music’s standout talents."

Commercial performance
Windy City debuted at number one on both the country and Americana charts in the US and UK, as well as number nine on the all-genre Billboard 200 with 38,000 album-equivalent units, of which 36,000 were pure album sales. As of March 2018 the album has sold 128,800 copies in the United States.

Track listing

Personnel

 Barry Bales - bass
 Richard Bennett - bass, acoustic guitar, electric guitar, Tic Tac
 Ron Block - gut string guitar
 Buddy Cannon - background vocals
 Melonie Cannon - background vocals
 Sidney Cox - background vocals
 Suzanne Cox - background vocals
 Chad Cromwell - drums
 Scott Ducaj - trumpet
 Teddy Gentry - background vocals
 John Hobbs - Hammond B3, piano
 Jim Horn - saxophone
 Jamey Johnson - background vocals
 Mike Johnson - lap steel guitar
 Alison Krauss - vocals, fiddle
 Kenny Malone - percussion
 Brent Mason - acoustic guitar, electric guitar 
 Joe Murphy - tuba
 Matt Rollings - piano
 Charles Rose - trombone
 Jeff Taylor - accordion
 Bobby Terry - acoustic guitar
 Dan Tyminski - background vocals
 Tommy White - lap steel guitar
 Hank Williams, Jr. - background vocals 

Strings

 Monisa Angell
 Zach Casebolt
 Seanad Chang
 Janet Darnall
 David Davidson
 Conni Ellisor
 Jim Grosjean
 Ali Hoffman
 Anthony LaMarchina
 Carole Rabinowitz
 Sari Reist
 Julia Tanner
 Wei Tsun Chang
 Mary Kathryn Van Osdale
 Vanosdale
 Katelyn Westergard
 Kristin Wilkinson
 Karen Winkelmann

Charts

Weekly charts

Year-end charts

Release history

References

2017 albums
Albums produced by Buddy Cannon
Country albums by American artists
Covers albums